Holiday Rush is a 2019 Christmas romantic comedy-drama film directed by Leslie Small and written by Sean Dwyer and Greg Cope White.

It was released on November 28, 2019.

Plot
Widowed hip-hop radio DJ Rashon "Rush" Williams loses his job at the radio station WMLE when it is bought by CamCom and switches to a pop format. He and his four children, who have become accustomed to a privileged life, are forced to downsize and move back into Aunt Jo's house where they lived before Rush became wealthy. Rush and his producer Roxy buy WBQL, an old radio station where they used to work, but CamCom puts pressure on advertisers to not buy advertising time from Rush and Roxy.

Rush and Roxy develop a romantic relationship but when Rush announces this to his children, Rush's son Jamal, already angry that he will not be able to afford Harvard anymore, runs away from home. Rush finds Jamal at his deceased mother's favorite location in a nearby park and Jamal expresses his discomfort living in their old house without his mother but comes to accept the new situation and his father's new relationship.

Rush finally manages to sell his large expensive house that he cannot afford anymore and Marshall from WMLE quits his job at the station and invests in WBQL, enabling them to broadcast during the Christmas season.

Cast
 Romany Malco as Rashon "Rush" Williams
 Sonequa Martin-Green as Roxy Richardson
 Deon Cole as Marshall Stone
 Amarr M. Wooten as Jamal Williams
 La La Anthony as Paula Williams
 Alysia Livingston as Janella
 Andrea-Marie Alphonse as Evie Williams
 Selena-Marie Alphonse as Gabby Williams
 Roscoe Orman as Reginald Miller
 Malika Samuel as Laurette
 Deysha Nelson as Mya Williams
 Tamala Jones as Jocelyn "Joss" Hawkins
 Darlene Love as Auntie Jo Robinson
 Stormi Maya as Katrina
 Jimmy Palumbo as Daniels
 Chris Walker as Brett the Tree Guy
 Rocco Parente, Jr. as Salvatore Manducati

Release
Holiday Rush was released on November 28, 2019.

See also
 List of Christmas films

References

External links
 
 

2019 films
2019 romantic comedy-drama films
2010s Christmas comedy-drama films
American Christmas comedy-drama films
Films directed by Leslie Small
Films about radio people
Films about widowhood
English-language Netflix original films
African-American romantic comedy-drama films
2010s English-language films
2010s American films